Audio porn is pornography which uses only audio. As it inherently provides that much is left to the imagination. As of 2019 it has become largely the purview of female producers and is increasing in popularity.

References

Audio porn
Pornography